The Papel Misionero Natural Cultural Reserve is a natural cultural reserve in the Misiones Province of Argentina.

Location

It is a protected area with managed resources, administered by the Fundación Selva Misionera.
The reserve is in the Alto Paraná Atlantic forests ecoregion.
The land is privately owned, and visitors are not allowed.
It would be part of the proposed Trinational Biodiversity Corridor, which aims to provide forest connections between conservation units in Brazil, Paraguay and Argentina in the Upper Paraná ecoregion.

History

The land was acquired by the Papel Misionero company in 1978.
The Papel Misionero Natural Cultural Reserve was created in 1994.
The objective is to protect a mature forest and a community of Guaraní people.
It was formalized by provincial law 3.256 of 1995.
In 1996 it was made part of the Yabotí Biosphere Reserve by law 3.375.
A bill in 2003 proposed that the site be declared of public utility and subject to purchase or expropriation to create a Natural Cultural Reserve under the full control of the province.

The reserve contains three villages of Mbayá people with a population in 2016 of about 340.
The local people would have access to the reserve to extract material for handicrafts, medicine and subsistence.

Environment

The reserve contains mountain forest vegetation in a good state of conservation.
70% of the reserve is covered by native forest.
Another 30% is being reforested with pine for commercial use.

37 species of mammals have been identified.
Mammals include South American tapir (Tapirus terrestris), white-lipped peccary (Tayassu pecari), water opossum (Chironectes minimus), giant anteater (Myrmecophaga tridactyla), greater naked-tailed armadillo (Cabassous tatouay), ocelot (Leopardus pardalis), jaguar (Panthera onca) and black howler (Alouatta caraya).
Birds include black-and-white hawk-eagle (Spizaetus melanoleucus), pheasant cuckoo (Dromococcyx phasianellus), rusty-barred owl (Strix hylophila), glittering-bellied emerald (Chlorostilbon lucidus), thick-billed saltator (Saltator maxillosus) and black-throated grosbeak (Saltator fuliginosus).

Notes

Sources

Protected areas of Misiones Province
1994 establishments in Argentina
Protected areas of the Atlantic Forest